Elmer Robert Burkart (February 1, 1917 – February 6, 1995) was a Major League Baseball (MLB) pitcher. Burkart played for the Philadelphia Phillies from 1936 to 1940. In sixteen career games, he had a 1–1 record with a 4.93 ERA. He batted and threw right-handed.

Biography
Burkart earned his only victory near the end of his MLB career on April 22, 1939. While he pitched the final two innings in relief against the Brooklyn Dodgers, the Phillies scored three runs in the bottom of the ninth inning for a 5–4 walk-off win. 

His only loss had come in the previous season when he pitched a complete game in the second game of a double-header at Braves Field as the Boston Bees defeated the Phillies, 4–1.

Burkart was born in Philadelphia, Pennsylvania, and died in Baltimore, Maryland. He was buried at Dulaney Valley Memorial Gardens.

References

External links

1917 births
1995 deaths
Philadelphia Phillies players
Baseball players from Philadelphia
Temple Owls baseball players